Shaila is the debut studio album by Shaila Dúrcal. It was released in 2004.

Track listing
Perdonamé
Qué Tienes Tú
Fuego En Las Venas
Si Yo Me Vuelvo A Enamorar 
Como Vivir Sin Ti
Dame Alas
Uno En Dos
En Ti
Se
Quédate En Mis Brazos

References

2004 debut albums
Shaila Dúrcal albums
Spanish-language albums